Damien Smith (born 1968) is a Canadian artist.

Life
Born in Ottawa, Ontario, Canada, Smith holds a BA (Hons) from the University of Guelph.

Work
Smith is known for his drawings of the architectural and social legacy of modernist design and its failed utopian agenda.

Exbitions
Solo and group exhibitions: 
 Brooklyn Museum of Art (2007), 
 Gasworks Gallery, London UK (2007), 
 Cornerhouse, Manchester UK (2007),*
Paul Morris Gallery, New York (1998, 2001), 
 Works On Paper Inc.,Los Angeles (2000 & 2002), 
 Experiments, SFMOMA, San Francisco (2001), 
 Art On Paper, Weatherspoon Art Museum, Greensboro, North Carolina (2002),
 Rena Bransten Gallery, San Francisco (2004), 
 Lucas Schoormans Galley, New York (2005),
 Walker Art Center, Minneapolis (2007),
 BravinLee Programs, New York (2009).

Collections
Smith's work is held in the public collections of: 
 the Walker Art Center,
 the SFMOMA,
 Houston Museum of Fine Arts and 
 the Canada Council.

Private collections: USA, United Kingdom, Canada, Denmark, the Netherlands.

References

External links
SFMOMA
Walker Art Center
Damien Smith

1969 births
Living people